Lincolnshire County Cricket Club was established on 28 September 1906; prior to that a county organisation had existed before, with Lincolnshire competing in the first Minor Counties Championship in 1895. The current club competed in the Minor Counties Championship from 1907 to 1914, and has since played minor counties cricket again from 1924, as well as playing in List A cricket from 1966 to 2004, using a different number of home grounds during that time. Their first home minor counties fixture in 1895 was against Norfolk at the Black Swan Ground, Spalding, while their first home List A match came 79 years later against Surrey in the 1974 Gillette Cup at Lindum Sports Club Ground, Lincoln.

The 23 grounds that Lincolnshire have used for home matches since 1895 are listed below, with statistics complete through to the end of the 2014 season.

Grounds

List A
Below is a complete list of grounds used by Lincolnshire County Cricket Club when it was permitted to play List A matches. These grounds have also held Minor Counties Championship and MCCA Knockout Trophy matches.

Minor Counties
Below is a complete list of grounds used by Lincolnshire County Cricket Club in Minor Counties Championship and MCCA Knockout Trophy matches.

Notes

References

Cricket grounds in Lincolnshire
Lincolnshire County Cricket Club
Lincolnshire